Khurasb (also Romanized as Khūrāsb; also known as Khorāsb) is a village in Margavar Rural District, Silvaneh District, Urmia County, West Azerbaijan Province, Iran. At the 2006 census, its population was 394, in 59 families.

References 

Populated places in Urmia County